Central Private School (CPS) or Central Private (CP) is a private education institution located in Central, Louisiana.  The school was founded in the 1967 amidst the court ordered desegregation of public schools.
CPS is one of several private schools located in East Baton Rouge Parish.

Faculty
The school's faculty is composed of 44.5 FTE teachers.

Curriculum 
Subjects include science, art, mathematics, language arts, physical education, social studies, and foreign languages.

Student body
The majority of the students are white (78%), along with students of other ethnicities. The school enrolls students from East Baton Rouge and surrounding areas.

Athletics 
Central Private joined the Louisiana High School Athletic Association (LHSAA) on July 1, 2019 and competes in the 1-A classification.

Sports offered:
Baseball
Basketball
Football
Golf

Athletics history
The school left the Louisiana Independent School Association in 1992 to join the Mississippi Private School Association (MPSA). The MPSA changed its name in 2009 to the Mississippi Association of Independent Schools (MAIS).

Championships
Baseball Championships
(12) Championships 

The school has won 12 championships since the school's opening including the years 1997, 1998, 1999, 2000, 2005, 2006, 2007, 2008, and 2013.

Basketball Championships
(5) Championships 

The school won four consecutive titles from 1998–2002. In 2013, Central Private's boys basketball team became the first boys team from the state of Louisiana to win the MAIS Overall Championship. The Riverdale Academy (Class A) girls won the Overall Tournament in 2003 making them the first Louisiana school to win the MAIS Overall Championship.

Mascot
In 2019, the school changed its athletic team name from The Rebels to The Redhawks.

Notable alumni
 Lane Mestepey, LSU Tigers baseball pitcher
 Josh Wall, MLB player (Los Angeles Dodgers)

References

Private K-12 schools in Louisiana
Segregation academies in Louisiana
Schools in East Baton Rouge Parish, Louisiana